El Ratón  ("The Mouse") is a 1957 Mexican film. It was directed by Chano Urueta.

It stars the famous world boxing champion Raul Macias, playing a version of himself.

Cast

Raul Macias
Anabelle Gutierrez
Alfredo Sadel
Quintín Bulnes
Miguel Manzano

External links
 

1957 films
Mexican action drama films
1950s Spanish-language films
Films directed by Chano Urueta
1950s Mexican films